Pyl Brook is a small stream in southwest London. It is a tributary of Beverley Brook, which is a tributary of the River Thames. Pyl Brook has two sources. The 5.3 kilometre main brook rises in Sutton Common in Sutton and flows through the London Borough of Merton to join Beverley Brook at Beverley Park in New Malden. The 3.9 kilometre East Pyl Brook also rises in Sutton and flows through Merton, joining the main Pyl east of Grand Drive in Raynes Park.

Local Nature Reserves
Two sections of the East Pyl are nature reserves. Pyl Brook Local Nature Reserve is an area of 1.3 hectares between the brook and the back gardens of houses in Rutland Drive, Morden. It is also a Site of Borough Importance for Nature Conservation, Grade II. In the mid-1980s the London Wildlife Trust adopted the site, but it is not on their list of reserves as of August 2015. It has mature hawthorn and elm scrub, with areas of crack-willow, elder, blackthorn and bramble. The entrance gate on a path which crosses the site is kept locked and there is no public access.

The brook also passes through Morden Park Local Nature Reserve.

References

Local nature reserves in Greater London
Nature reserves in the London Borough of Merton
Rivers of London
London Wildlife Trust
2Pyl